Jacques Morel may refer to:

 Jacques Morel (writer) (19th/20th-century), French writer
 Jacques Morel (actor) (1922–2008), French actor
 Jacques Morel (rower) (born 1935), French rower
 Jacques Morel (politician) (born 1948), Belgian Ecolo politician
 Jacques Morel (artist) (1395–1459), French sculptor
  (1749), French composer and viol player